Edwin William Hernández Herrera (born 10 July 1986) is a former Mexican professional footballer who last played as left-back for Liga de Balompié Mexicano club Chapulineros de Oaxaca.

He signed with the Chapulineros de Oaxaca of the Liga de Balompié Mexicano ahead of the league's inaugural season, leading them to a title with a victory over Atlético Veracruz in the finals.

Honours

Club

León
 Liga de Ascenso: Clausura 2012
 Liga MX: Apertura 2013, Clausura 2014

Guadalajara
 Liga MX: Clausura 2017
 Copa MX: Apertura 2015, Clausura 2017
 Supercopa MX: 2016
 CONCACAF Champions League: 2018

Chapulineros de Oaxaca
 Liga de Balompié Mexicano: 2020–21, 2021

Individual
 CONCACAF Champions League Best XI: 2018

References

External links 
 
 
 
 

1980 births
Living people
People from Pachuca
Footballers from Hidalgo (state)
Mexican expatriate footballers
Association football fullbacks
C.F. Pachuca players
Indios de Ciudad Juárez footballers
San Luis F.C. players
Club León footballers
C.D. Guadalajara footballers
Liga MX players
Ascenso MX players
Segunda División B players
Mexico international footballers
Mexican expatriate sportspeople in Spain
Expatriate footballers in Spain
Liga de Balompié Mexicano players
Mexican footballers